International School of Nanshan Shenzhen (ISNS), formerly the International School of Sino-Canada, is a part of the Taoyuan Sub-District (桃源街道), Nanshan District, Shenzhen, China.

It is accredited by the New Brunswick Department of Education in Canada. The school provides students with a Canadian curriculum that is internationally recognized. ISNS is the first IB World School in Shenzhen, China, to be authorized in the International Baccalaureate (IB) for the Primary Years Programme, Middle Years Programme, and Diploma Programme. 

ISNS was founded in 2002 through the cooperation of the Government of Canada, the Province of New Brunswick and Dr. Francis Pang to fulfil a local need for international education.

, it is one of eight schools in Shenzhen designated for children of foreign workers. The school guarantees a low  students teacher ratio, no greater than 25 students in kindergarten to grade 12. Every classroom is equipped with a SmartBoard and has access to class sets of MacBooks and iPads. The campus includes a large gymnasium, full outdoor track and field,  playground, table-tennis, basketball, and volleyball courts.

Curriculum 

The International School of Nanshan Shenzhen, which is accredited by the New Brunswick Department of Education in Canada, providing its students with an internationally recognized Canadian curriculum as well as the International Baccalaureate (IB) Primary Years Programme, Middle Years Programme, and Diploma Programme. Students who successfully complete graduation requirements can receive both a Canadian Diploma and an IB Diploma. 

Canadian officials support and review the educational programs and teaching methodologies. Students also write Provincial assessments (Province of New Brunswick, Canada) to ensure curriculum consistency.

The International School of Nanshan Shenzhen offers classes from Kindergarten to Grade 12, with Elementary, Middle School and High School sections. Students are also prepared to take the Standardized Admissions Test (SAT).

English as Additional Language (EAL) classes are offered to non-English speaking students based on a student assessment using the Cambridge System upon admission. Students also attend one Mandarin as a second language class each day.

As well as being linked with the Canadian Province of New Brunswick's Department of Education, ISNS is also affiliated with UNESCO, and ACAMIS (Association of China and Mongolia International Schools).

Admissions 

Applications for admissions at the International School of Nanshan Shenzhen are accepted throughout the academic year, which runs from August to June of the following year.

Affiliated school 
 Canadian International School of Beijing

See also
 Education in Shenzhen

References

External links
 International School of Nanshan Shenzhen

Private schools in China
Schools in Guangdong
High schools in Shenzhen
Association of China and Mongolia International Schools
2002 establishments in China
Educational institutions established in 2002